Libertad is a Peru football club, located in the city of Trujillo, La Libertad. The club was founded with the name of Club Libertad de Trujillo.

History
The club was 1987 Copa Perú champion, when defeated Capitán Clavero, Bancos Unidos and San Martín de Porres in the Final Stage.

The club have played at the highest level of Peruvian football on four occasions, from 1988 Torneo Descentralizado until 1991 Torneo Descentralizado when was relegated.

Honours

National
Copa Perú: 1
1987

See also
List of football clubs in Peru
Peruvian football league system

External links
 Official Web (Spanish)

Association football clubs established in 1939
Football clubs in Trujillo, Peru